Nine Partners Creek (also known as Leslie Creek) is a tributary of Tunkhannock Creek in Susquehanna County, Pennsylvania, in the United States. The creek has two named tributaries: Butler Creek and Leslie Creek. The surficial geology in the vicinity of Nine Partners Creek includes Wisconsinan Till, alluvium, bedrock, alluvial fan, and wetlands. The creek's drainage basin is designated as a Coldwater Fishery and a Migratory Fishery.

Course
Nine Partners Creek begins in a small unnamed pond on a hill in New Milford Township. It flows east-northeast for a few tenths of a mile before passing through Hunt Lake, and then turns south. After a few tenths of a mile, the creek turns southeast for more than a mile, entering Harford Township. Here, it turns south-southeast for several tenths of a mile before beginning to flow south alongside Interstate 81, crossing Pennsylvania Route 547 and receiving the tributary Leslie Creek from the right. After a few miles, it flows south-southeast for more than a mile before turning south again. Several tenths of a mile further downstream, the creek receives the tributary Butler Creek from the left and enters Lenox Township. Here, it continues flowing south for several tenths of a mile before turning south-southeast. Several tenths of a mile further downstream, the creek crosses Pennsylvania Route 92 and reaches its confluence with Tunkhannock Creek.

Tributaries
Nine Partners Creek has two named tributaries: Butler Creek and Leslie Creek.

Geography and geology

The surficial geology inside the valley of Nine Partners Creek in its lower reaches mainly consists of alluvium and fill, although there is a small patch of alluvial fan. The sides of the valley have surficial geology containing a till known as Wisconsinan Till and bedrock consisting of sandstone and shale. Further upstream the surficial geology is similar, but with two more alluvial fan patches and a wetland patch. Along the uppermost reaches of the creek, includes Wisconsinan Till (especially at the headwaters) and alluvium, as well as small patches of alluvial fan and wetland.

Nine Partners Creek has been described as a "small creek". Some sources describe the creek as flowing into Leslie Creek, which is one of its tributaries.

Watershed
The mouth of the creek is in the United States Geological Survey quadrangle of Lenoxville. However, its source is in the quadrangle of Harford. The creek's mouth is located near East Lenox.

A natural lake known as Hunt Lake is located in Nine Partners Creek. Other lakes in the creek's watershed, on tributaries of the creek, include the  Tyler Lake and the  Tingley Lake.

Interstate 81 is located in the vicinity of Nine Partners Creek. The reach of the highway running in the creek's vicinity was built in the 1960s.

History
The creek is also known as Leslie Creek. This variant name appears in a 1981 map of Susquehanna County from the Pennsylvania Department of Transportation. However, in the 1960s, it was found that all locals who were asked referred to the creek as Nine Partners Creek.

Nine Partners Creek receives its name from an association of early settlers who came from Connecticut.

Biology
The drainage basin of Nine Partners Creek is designated as a Coldwater Fishery and a Migratory Fishery.

This was the only occurrence of a trout entering a tributary stream during the study. Fishing can be done in the creek.

In the upper part of the Nine Partners Creek watershed, 65.4 percent of the watersheds have a Habitat Quality Index (the maximum probability of finding brook trout in a zero-stress situation) of at least 0.50.

See also
Partners Creek, next tributary of Tunkhannock Creek going downstream
Bell Creek (Tunkhannock Creek), next tributary of Tunkhannock Creek going upstream
List of rivers of Pennsylvania

References

Rivers of Susquehanna County, Pennsylvania
Tributaries of Tunkhannock Creek